The 141st district of the Texas House of Representatives contains parts of north-central Houston and Humble. It is one of the least-White districts in the state legislature. The current Representative is Senfronia Thompson, who was first elected in 1973.

References 

141